C. concinna may refer to:

 Caladenia concinna, a Western Australian orchid
 Callopistria concinna, an owlet moth
 Calyptranthes concinna, a flowering plant
 Canavalia concinna, a jack-bean
 Canna concinna, a perennial plant
 Caprella concinna, a skeleton shrimp
 Carex concinna, a North American sedge
 Castanopsis concinna, a Chinese tree
 Cerceris concinna, a sphecoid wasp
 Chaetocnema concinna, a leaf beetle
 Chrysemys concinna, a freshwater turtle
 Clarkia concinna, a Californian wildflower
 Coelogyne concinna, a sympodial epiphyte
 Crosseola concinna, a sea snail
 Cyclaspis concinna, a cumacean crustacean